Season 1888–89 was the 13th season in which Hibernian competed at a Scottish national level, entering the Scottish Cup for the 14th time.

Overview 

Hibs reached the first round of the Scottish Cup, losing 2–1 to Mossend Swifts.

Results 

All results are written with Hibs' score first.

Scottish Cup

See also
List of Hibernian F.C. seasons

Notes

External links 
 Results For Season 1888/1889 in All Competitions, www.ihibs.co.uk

Hibernian F.C. seasons
Hibernian